Paul Gonsalves ( – ) was an American jazz tenor saxophonist best known for his association with Duke Ellington. At the 1956 Newport Jazz Festival, Gonsalves played a 27-chorus solo in the middle of Ellington's "Diminuendo and Crescendo in Blue," a performance credited with revitalizing Ellington's waning career in the 1950s.

Biography
Born in Brockton, Massachusetts, to Cape Verdean parents, Gonsalves' first instrument was the guitar, and as a child he was regularly asked to play Cape Verdean folk songs for his family. He grew up in New Bedford, Massachusetts, and played as a member of the Sabby Lewis Orchestra. His first professional engagement in Boston was with the same group on tenor saxophone, in which he played before and after his military service during World War II. He also played with fellow Cape Verdean Americans in Phil Edmund's band in the 1940s. Before joining Duke Ellington's orchestra in 1950, he also played in big bands led by Count Basie (1947–1949) and Dizzy Gillespie (1949–1950).

At the 1956 Newport Jazz Festival, Gonsalves' solo in Ellington's "Diminuendo and Crescendo in Blue" went through 27 choruses; the publicity from this performance is credited with reviving Ellington's career. The performance is captured on the album Ellington at Newport. Gonsalves was a featured soloist in numerous Ellingtonian settings. He received the nickname "The Strolling Violins" from Ellington for playing solos while walking through the crowd.

Gonsalves died in London ten days before Duke Ellington's death, after a lifetime of addiction to alcohol and narcotics. Mercer Ellington refused to tell Duke of the passing of Gonsalves, fearing the shock might further accelerate his father's decline. Ellington and Gonsalves, along with trombonist Tyree Glenn, lay side by side in the same New York funeral home for a period of time.

Gonsalves is buried at the Long Island National Cemetery in Farmingdale, New York.

Discography

As leader/co-leader 
 Cookin'  (1957, Argo)
 Diminuendo, Crescendo and Blues (1958, RCA Victor)
 Ellingtonia Moods and Blues (1960, RCA Victor)
 Gettin' Together! (1961, Jazzland)
 Tenor Stuff (1961, Columbia) – with Harold Ashby
 Tell It the Way It Is! (1963, Impulse)
 Cleopatra Feelin' Jazzy (1963, Impulse)
 Salt and Pepper (1963, Impulse) – with Sonny Stitt
 Rare Paul Gonsalves Sextet in Europe (1963, Jazz Connoisseur)
 Boom-Jackie-Boom-Chick (1964, Vocalion)
 Just Friends (1964, Columbia EMI) – with Tubby Hayes
 Change of Setting (1965, World Record Club) – with Tubby Hayes
 Jazz Till Midnight (1967, Storyville)
 Love Calls (1967, RCA) – with Eddie Lockjaw Davis
 Encuentro (1968, Fresh Sound)
 With the Swingers and the Four Bones (1969, Riviera)
 Humming Bird (1970, Deram)
 Just a-Sittin' and a-Rockin'  (1970, Black Lion)
 Paul Gonsalves and His All Stars (1970, Riviera)
 Paul Gonsalves Meets Earl Hines (1970, Black Lion)
 Mexican Bandit Meets Pittsburgh Pirate (1973, Fantasy)
 Paul Gonsalves Paul Quinichette (1974)
 Sitting In (Paul Gonsalves and Clyde Fats Wright) (2014, Silk City)

As sideman
With Duke Ellington

Ellington at Newport (Columbia, 1956)
All Star Road Band (Doctor Jazz, 1957 [1983])
All Star Road Band Volume 2 (Doctor Jazz, 1964 [1985])
Hot Summer Dance (Red Baron, 1960 [1991])
Live At The Crystal Gardens 1952
Harlem 1964
Ella and Duke at the Côte d’Azur 1966
The Far East Suite 1966
Liederhalle Stuttgart 1967
Live At The Opernhaus Cologne 1969
70th Birthday Concert 1969
Featuring Paul Gonsalves (Fantasy, 1985)
With Eddie "Lockjaw" Davis
Love Calls (RCA Victor, 1968)
With Johnny Hodges
Ellingtonia '56 (Norgran, 1956)
The Big Sound (Verve, 1957)
Triple Play (RCA Victor, 1967)
With John Lewis
The Wonderful World of Jazz (Atlantic, 1960)
With Billy Taylor
Taylor Made Jazz (Argo, 1959)
With Clark Terry
Duke with a Difference (Riverside, 1957)
Diminuendo, Crescendo And Blues (RCA Victor, 1958)
With Jimmy Woode
The Colorful Strings of Jimmy Woode (Argo, 1957)
With Joya Sherrill
Joya Sherrill Sings Duke (20th Century Fox, 1965)

References

External links 
 

1920 births
1974 deaths
Swing saxophonists
Bebop saxophonists
Mainstream jazz saxophonists
American jazz tenor saxophonists
American male saxophonists
Duke Ellington Orchestra members
Count Basie Orchestra members
American musicians of Cape Verdean descent
Musicians from Brockton, Massachusetts
Impulse! Records artists
20th-century American musicians
20th-century saxophonists
Jazz musicians from Massachusetts
American male jazz musicians
Black Lion Records artists
20th-century American male musicians